Minamoto no Ienaga (源家長, Minamoto no Ienaga, c. 1170 – 1234) was a waka poet and Japanese nobleman active in the early Kamakura period.

External links 
E-text of his poems in Japanese

Japanese poets
1170 deaths
1234 deaths
Minamoto clan
People of Kamakura-period Japan